Serge Rezvani (born Cyrus Rezvani in 1928) is a French painter, engraver, writer (novels, plays), as well as a songwriter-composer-performer (he describes himself as "multidisciplinary") He is also known by his pseudonym Cyrus Bassiak.

Life 
Born in Tehran, Rezvani is the son of a Persian father, Medjid-Khan Rezvani (1900–1962), and a Jewish mother who had immigrated from Russia. His mother moved with him to France when he was age seven and spoke only Russian. He attended a boarding school for Russian immigrants, where he learned French.

Rezvani has written more than 40 novels, 15 plays and two collections of poetry. Rezvani also wrote two songs for Godart's Pierrot le fou: Jean-Paul Belmondo and Anna Karina sing, Jamais je ne t'ai dit que je t'aimerais toujours, ô mon amour and Ma ligne de chance.

After losing his first wife, Lula, to Alzheimer's in 2004, in mid-2005 he re-established acquaintance with the French actress Marie-José Nat, who was then the widow of Michel Drach. The two couples had known each other and had briefly met in the 1960s. Serge and Marie-José married on 30 September 2005, aware (as they themselves said) that they would have only a few more years to live, and he wrote a book about their relationship, Ultime amour. Rezvani lived with Marie-José Nat in Bonifacio until her death in October 2019.

Work

Bibliography

Novels, tales and autobiographical writings

Theatre 
 
 
 
 
 
 
 
 La guerre des salamandres (unpublished)

Essays

Poetry

Translations 
 Translation in French of Platonov, the first play by Anton Chekhov, which bears the seeds of Chekhov's entire future work. Platonov, le fléau de l'absence de père, French text and foreword by Rezvani, Actes Sud, series "Babel", 2003.
 Translation of the Iranian author Rubaiyat of Omar Khayyam.

Art books 
 Pour une philosophie du jardin, éditions Tohu-Bohu, 15 March 2019, .

References

External links 
 Official website
 Rezvani interprète, interview by RFI
 
 
 Le questionnaire de la chouette, on Les Belles Lettres publishing house, 20 May 2015.
 Le tourbillon de la vie, the guitar player is S. Rezvani.

20th-century French non-fiction writers
21st-century French non-fiction writers
20th-century French dramatists and playwrights
21st-century French dramatists and playwrights
Grand prix Jean Giono recipients
20th-century French painters
20th-century male artists
21st-century French painters
21st-century male artists
20th-century French  male singers
French lyricists
1928 births
Living people
People from Tehran
Naïve Records artists
Iranian emigrants to France
Iranian people of Russian-Jewish descent
French people of Russian-Jewish descent
French people of Iranian descent